Fredrik Raahauge Petersen (born 27 August 1983) is a Swedish handballer for IFK Ystad. He was part of the Swedish team that won the silver medal at the 2012 Summer Olympics. With HSV Hamburg he won the EHF Champions League 2013.

In 2021 he announced he would end his career as a player, and instead work as a Sporting director for IFK Ystad. However, he made a comeback as player in IFK Ystad in December 2021.

References

External links 
 Fredrik Raahauge Petersen at the European Handball Federation
 
 

1983 births
Living people
Swedish male handball players
Handball players at the 2012 Summer Olympics
Handball players at the 2016 Summer Olympics
Olympic handball players of Sweden
Olympic silver medalists for Sweden
Olympic medalists in handball
Medalists at the 2012 Summer Olympics
People from Ystad Municipality
Füchse Berlin Reinickendorf HBC players
Expatriate handball players
Handball-Bundesliga players
Swedish expatriate sportspeople in Germany
Swedish expatriate sportspeople in Denmark
Sportspeople from Skåne County